Borek  (German Waldwinkel) is a village in the administrative district of Gmina Krapkowice, within Krapkowice County, Opole Voivodeship, in southwestern Poland.

References

Borek